Bourbonnais is a historic province in the centre of France.

Bourbonnais may also refer to:
 Bourbonnais dialects, spoken in the Bourbonnais region
 Bourbonnais Creole, French-based creoles spoken in the western Indian Ocean
 Bourbonnais, Illinois, a village in Illinois, US
 Bourbonnais Township, Kankakee County, Illinois

See also 
 
 Bourbonnais route, a connection of canals
 Bourbonnais Donkey, a breed of donkey
 Bourbonnais Grey, a breed of rabbit
 Braque du Bourbonnais, a dog breed
 Boulonnais (disambiguation)